The Amazing Meeting (TAM), stylized as The Amaz!ng Meeting, was an annual conference that focused on science, skepticism, and critical thinking; it was held for twelve years. The conference started in 2003 and was sponsored by the James Randi Educational Foundation (JREF). Perennial speakers included Penn & Teller, Phil Plait, Michael Shermer and James "The Amazing" Randi. Speakers at the four-day conference were selected from a variety of disciplines including scientific educators, magicians, and community activists. Outside the plenary sessions the conference included workshops, additional panel discussions, music and magic performances and live taping of podcasts including The Skeptics' Guide to the Universe. The final Amazing Meeting was held in July 2015.

History and organization
TAM was first held in 2003, attracting around 150 attendees. When the CSICOP conferences entered a seven-year hiatus in 2005, TAM quickly filled the gap and, with more than 1,000 attendees, developed to become the largest U.S. skeptical conference.

The Skeptics Society and the Committee for Skeptical Inquiry were co-sponsors of the event, providing both financial and promotional support.

People attended the conference for a variety of reasons. The Daily Beast reported that some saw themselves "as waging a broad, multifront battle to drag American culture, inch by inch, away from the nonscientific and the nonlogical". While the organizer of TAM London, Tracy King, said "People come to TAM because they want to learn and hear from leading speakers on subjects which interest them, but they want to have a good time doing it. Our mix of academics, comedians and writers ensures an incredible event where the public can meet like-minded people without feeling like being into science or geek stuff makes them a minority." Magicians were also given a central role at the conference.

The magazine The Skeptic from the Australian Skeptics gave a detailed account of all lectures from the 2010 OZ event.

Randi retired from active participation in the JREF in early 2015; a final TAM was organized in his honour in July 2015. After this, the Committee for Skeptical Inquiry chose Las Vegas as the location for CSICon 2016 to fill the void.

At The Amazing Meeting in 2011 (TAM 9) the Independent Investigations Group (IIG) organised a tribute to James Randi. The group gathered together with other attendees, put on fake white beards, and posed for a large group photo with Randi. At the CSICon in 2017, in absence of Randi, the IIG organised another group photo with leftover beards from the 2011 photo. After Randi was sent the photo, he replied, "I’m always very touched by any such expression. This is certainly no exception. You have my sincere gratitude. I suspect, however that a couple of those beards were fake. But I’m in a forgiving mood at the moment. I’m frankly very touched. I’ll see you at the next CSICon. Thank you all."

Paranormal Challenge
Beginning in 2009, the Amazing Meeting also hosted a public test of The One Million Dollar Paranormal Challenge for the performance of any paranormal, occult or supernatural event, under proper observing conditions. At The Amazing Meeting 7, it was announced that the $1 Million Challenge prize would not expire in 2010 as previously announced.

Claimant Connie Sonne in 2009 failed to find target cards in sealed envelopes using a dowsing pendulum. Mentalist Mark Edward was the only person to interview her after her test; he wrote that the room was rapt in close attention, "It was an amazing testament to just how single-minded a conference room full of skeptical non-believers could be. I dare say that even a few of the thousand assembled might have been in some way mentally rooting for Connie to win or score some significant record for her trouble. She didn’t." She stated to Edward that it was not time for her "powers to be revealed" and blamed no-one for her failures, only citing that she was involved in future world-changing events.

In 2013 a man from Algeria was the Million Dollar challenger. He claimed to be able to remote view objects that were held in a sealed room. He was unable to see the objects and thus failed the challenge.

Applicant Fei Wang appeared before the skeptic audience July 2014 with the claim that he could send energy through his hand using a type of therapeutic touch. The organizers set up a double blind test involving a volunteer selected by Wang to place their hand in a box while wearing noise canceling headphones and a blindfold. Wang or the control person (Jamy Ian Swiss) depending on the roll of a die would insert their hand also in the box (not touching the volunteer) for several seconds. Swiss was selected to be the control because Wang felt that Swiss does not have the ability that is being tested. After either Wang or the Control (Swiss) had placed their hand in the box, the volunteer would state which energy was felt. Wang had to get 8 out of 9 correct in order to pass to the final Million Dollar challenge. After the volunteer was unable to feel the energy that Wang said he was sending through his hand on the first two tries, the test was concluded as it was no longer possible for Wang to win the challenge even if he was chosen correct on the remaining tries.

Tech journalist Lee Hutchinson approached the JREF after writing an article for Ars Technica about directional Ethernet cables that claim to "keep your audio signal completely free of electromagnetic interference". The MDC set up a controlled double-blind demonstration with volunteers listening to two identical recordings with a randomly selected Ethernet cable, a normal one or the cable claiming to improve the listening experience. After six volunteers, the demonstration was called off, as they were unable to select the "enhanced" cable over the common cable.

The tests included:

Special awards
The James Randi Education Foundation presented special awards at the Amazing Meeting to people who they label champions of skepticism. Robert S. Lancaster received the 2009 Citizen Skeptic award for his work on the website Stop Sylvia which critically examines the claims of self-proclaimed psychic Sylvia Browne.

At that year's TAM London the award for Outstanding Contribution to Skepticism went to Simon Singh in recognition for his successful appeal against a libel charge by the British Chiropractic Association.

In 2010 at TAM London then 15-year-old Rhys Morgan received a special grassroots skepticism award from Randi.

Reed Esau received the James Randi Award for Skepticism in the Public Interest at TAM 2012 for his work inventing SkeptiCamp.

At TAM 2013, the award winner was Susan Gerbic for her work with crowd-sourced activism, specifically her work as the leader of the Guerrilla Skepticism on Wikipedia (GSoW) project.

The award reads:

Locations and dates
In addition to the Las Vegas-based conferences the JREF also sponsored international TAM conferences, with the first TAM London taking place in 2009 and TAM Australia in 2010, co-sponsored by Australian Skeptics, in 2010. A related series of events titled The Amazing Adventure has been held featuring trips to the Bermuda Triangle (2007), an Alaskan cruise (2007), the Galapagos Islands (2008), Mexico (2009), and the Caribbean (2010).

References

External links
 
 

Skeptic organizations in the United States
Skeptic conferences
Recurring events established in 2003